Microviridae is a family of bacteriophages with a single-stranded DNA genome. The name of this family is derived from the ancient Greek word , meaning "small". This refers to the size of their genomes, which are among the smallest of the DNA viruses. Enterobacteria, intracellular parasitic bacteria, and spiroplasma serve as natural hosts. There are 22 species in this family, divided among seven genera and two subfamilies.

Virology
The virions are non-enveloped, round with an icosahedral symmetry (T = 1). They have a diameter between 25–27 nanometers and lack tails. Each virion has 60 copies each of the F, G, and J proteins and 12 copies of the H protein. They have 12 pentagonal trumpet-shaped pentamers (~7.1 nm wide × 3.8 nm high), each of which is composed of 5 copies of the G and one of the H protein.

Viruses in this family replicate their genomes via a rolling circle mechanism and encode dedicated RCR initiation proteins.

Although the majority of species in this family have lytic life cycles, a few may have temperate life cycles.

Genome

The genome sizes range from 4.5–6kb and is circular. It encodes 11 genes (in order: A, A*, B, C, K, D, E, J, F, G, and H), nine of which are essential. The nonessential genes are E and K. Several of the genes have overlapping reading frames. Protein A* is encoded within protein A. It lacks ~1/3 of the amino acids from the N terminal of the A protein and is encoded in the same frame as the A protein. It is translated from an internal start site within the messenger RNA. Gene E is encoded with gene D with a +1 frameshift. Gene K overlaps genes A, B, and C. The origin of replication lies within a 30 base sequence. The entire 30 base sequence is required for replication.

Molecular biology
The major capsid protein (F) has 426 amino acids, the major spike protein (G) has 175 amino acids, the small DNA-binding protein (J) has 25–40 amino acids, and the DNA pilot protein (H) has 328 amino acids. The major folding motif of protein F is the eight-stranded antiparallel beta barrel common to many viral capsid proteins. The G protein is a tight beta barrel with its strands running radially outward. The G proteins occur in groups of five forming 12 spikes that enclose a hydrophilic channel. The highly basic J protein lacks any secondary structure and is situated in an interior cleft of the F protein. It has no acidic amino acid residues in the protein and the twelve basic residues are concentrated in two clusters in the N-terminus separated by a proline-rich region.

Assembly of the virion uses two scaffolding proteins, internal scaffolding protein B and external scaffolding protein D. The function of protein B seems to be to lower the amount of protein D needed by the virion for assembly. Protein H is a multifunctional structural protein required for piloting the viral DNA into the host cell interior during the entry process. Protein E is a 91-amino acid membrane protein that causes host cell lysis by inhibiting the host translocase MraY. This inhibitory activity is located within the N terminal 29 amino acids. Protein A is a single strand endonuclease and is responsible for the initiation of viral DNA replication. It catalyses cleavage and ligation of a phosphodiester bond between a G and A nucleotide residue pair at the phi X origin. It may not be essential for phage viability but burst sizes are reduced by 50% when it is mutated. Protein A* inhibits host DNA replication. Unlike protein A it is capable of cleaving the phi X viral DNA in the presence of single-stranded binding protein of the host. Protein A*, like Protein A, may not be required for phage viability. Protein C increases the fidelity of the termination and reinitiation reactions and is required for the packagaging of the viral DNA in to the protein shell. Protein K has 56 amino acids and is found in the membrane of the host cell. It appears to be able to increase the burst size of the virus.

Taxonomy
This family is divided into two subfamilies: Gokushovirinae and Bullavirinae (former genus Microvirus). These groups differ in their hosts, genome structure, and viron composition. The name Gokushovirinae is derived from the Japanese for very small. Gokushoviruses are currently known to infect only obligate intra-cellular parasites. The members of the subfamily Bullavirinae all infect Enterobacteria.

A putative third grouping has been proposed—Alpavirinae—which infect the order Bacteroidales. This a group of viruses known only as prophages and additional work on these viruses seems indicated before subfamily status is granted.

A fourth clade has been proposed—Pichovirinae. This clade has a genome organisation that differs from the other members of this family. The name is derived from picho which means small in Occitan.

Another virus has been isolate from the turkey gut with features similar to other microviruses but quite distinct from the known species.

Notes
Members of the subfamily Bullavirinae (former genus Microvirus) have four structural proteins: major capsid protein F, major spike protein G, a small DNA-binding protein J (25 - 40 amino acids in length) and DNA pilot protein H. Assembly of the viron uses two scaffolding proteins, internal scaffolding protein B and external scaffolding protein D. Protein H is a multifunctional structural protein required for piloting the viral DNA into the host cell interior during the entry process. The genomes are between 5.3 and 6.2 kilobases (kb) in length.

Members of this subfamily can be separated into three main clades according to genome sizes. Size variability within the groups occurs mainly as a result of insertions and deletions of the intergenic regions. Viruses are assigned according to their similarity to known lab based strains—the  ΦX174-like clade, G4-like clade and the α3-like clade. The ΦX174-like clade of microviridae have the smallest and least variable genomes (5,386–5,387 bp); the G4-like clade varies in size from 5,486–5,487 bp; while the largest genome sized group is the α3-like clade with genomes ranging from 6,061–6259bp.

Members of the subfamily Gokushovirinae have only two structural proteins: capsid proteins F (Virus Protein 1) and DNA pilot protein H (Virus Protein 2) and do not use scaffolding proteins. They also possess 'mushroom-like' protrusions positioned at the three-fold axes of symmetry of their icosahedral capsids. These are formed by large insertion loops within the protein F of gokushoviruses and are absent in the microviruses. They lack both the external scaffolding protein D and the major spike protein G of the species in the genus Microvirus. The genomes of this group tend to be smaller—about 4.5 kb in length. This subfamily includes the genera Bdellomicrovirus, Chlamydiamicrovirus and Spiromicrovirus.

Life cycle
There are a number of steps in the life cycle

1. Adsorption to the host via specific receptor(s)

2. Movement of the viral DNA into the host cell

3. Conversion of the single strand form to a double-stranded intermediate

This is known as the replicative form I.

4. Transcription of early genes

5. Replication of the viral genome

Viral protein A cleaves replicative form I DNA strand at the origin of replication (ori) and covalently attaches itself to the DNA, generating replicative form II molecule. Replication of the genome now begins via a rolling circle mechanism. The host's DNA polymerase converts the single-stranded DNA into double-stranded DNA.

6. Late genes are now transcribed by the host's RNA polymerase.

7. Synthesis of the new virons

Viral protein C binds to replication complex, inducing packaging of new viral positive-stranded DNA into procapsids. The preinitiation complex consists of the host cell protein rep and viral A and C proteins. These associate with the procapsid forming a 50S complex.

8. Maturation of the virons in the host cytoplasm

9. Release from the host

Cell lysis is mediated by the phiX174-encoded protein E, which inhibits the peptidoglycan synthesis leading to an eventual bursting of the infected cell.

References

Further reading
Roykta, D.R. et al., 2006. Horizontal Gene Transfer and the Evolution of Microvirid Coliphage Genomes. Journal of Bacteriology, 118(3) p1134–1142

External links 

 Viralzone: Microviridae
 List of sequenced genomes 
 ICTV

 
Virus families
Bacteriophages